Matthew Stephen Klimow (born June 10, 1952) is an American diplomat who has served as the United States Ambassador to Turkmenistan since 2019. On August 31, 2020, Klimow assumed office as the acting Inspector General of the Department of State and left on December 11.

Early life and education 

Born in the state of New York, Klimow earned his Bachelor of Science at the United States Military Academy in 1974 and a Master of Arts from Webster University in St. Louis, Missouri in 1982. He received a Masters of Military Art and Science from the School of Advanced Military Studies at the United States Army Command and General Staff College in 1989 with a thesis entitled Surrender - a soldier's legal, ethical, and moral obligations; with Philippine case study.

Career

Military service 
Klimow served as a United States Army officer from 1974 to 2003, retiring with the rank of colonel. His military assignments included from 2002 to 2003, serving as a Special Advisor to the Vice President of the United States and Executive Assistant to the Chairman from 2001 to 2002 and the Vice Chairman of the Joint Chiefs of Staff from 2001 to 2000. He also served as a Combat Task Force Operations Officer during Operation Desert Storm in Saudi Arabia and Kuwait from 1990 to 1991, for which he was awarded the Silver Star Medal. Other assignments include Brigade Commander in the 18th Airborne Corps at Fort Bragg, North Carolina from 1998 to 2000, Military Advisor to the Secretary of State and Special Assistant, Office of the Chairman of the Joint Chiefs of Staff from 1995 to 1998 and Visiting Defense Fellow at the Center for International Relations, Queen's University, Canada from 1994 to 1995.

Diplomacy 
From 2012 to 2015, Klimow served as a Deputy Assistant Secretary General of the North Atlantic Treaty Organization (NATO) in Brussels, Belgium. From 2018 to 2019, he served as Senior Advisor in the Office of the Under Secretary for Management at the United States Department of State. He served as Senior Advisor in the Bureau of the Director General and Human Resources and in the Office of Overseas Employment from 2015 to 2018. He also served as the Executive Director of the Bureau of Administration and Bureau of Information Resource Management from 2010 to 2012 and as Director of Language Services from 2008 to 2010, and Executive Director of the Bureau of Consular Affairs from 2003 to 2008 at the State Department

On March 18, 2019, President Donald Trump announced his intent to nominate Klimow as the next United States Ambassador to Turkmenistan. On March 26, 2019, his nomination was sent to the United States Senate. On May 23, 2019, his nomination was confirmed by the Senate by voice vote. He was sworn in on June 13, 2019 and presented his credentials to President Gurbanguly Berdimuhamedow in Ashgabat on June 26, 2019.

On August 31, 2020, Secretary of State Mike Pompeo appointed Klimow to serve as acting inspector general of the State Department. He was expected to serve through the end of the year but resigned abruptly effective Friday, December 11. He intends to eventually return to his post in Turkmenistan.

Personal life 
Klimow speaks French. He is married to retired Major Edie Gunnels and they have a son.

See also
List of ambassadors of the United States

References

1952 births
Living people
Place of birth missing (living people)
United States Military Academy alumni
Military personnel from New York (state)
Webster University alumni
United States Army Command and General Staff College alumni
United States Army personnel of the Gulf War
Recipients of the Silver Star
United States Army colonels
21st-century American diplomats
United States Department of State officials
Ambassadors of the United States to Turkmenistan